Meisam Salehi, also known as Meysam Salehi (born 17 November 1998) is an Iranian volleyball player who plays as an outside hitter for the Iranian national volleyball team. He made his maiden appearance at the Olympic Games in Tokyo 2020. #milsam

Career

Clubs
Salehi made his debut in the Iranian Super League for Kalleh Mazandaran in 2017. In 2020, he signed a contract with Shahrdari Urmia, and one year later won a silver medal of the Iranian Championship. For the 2021–22 season, he joined Indykpol AZS Olsztyn, PlusLiga.

National team
He was part of the team which finished fifth at the 2017 U21 World Championship held in Czech Republic. A member of the teams that competed at the 2018, 2019 and 2021 Nations League editions. Salehi was part of the Iranian national team which competed at the 2020 Summer Olympics.

References

External links
 Player profile at PlusLiga.pl
 Player profile at Volleybox.net
 

Living people
1998 births
People from Urmia
Iranian men's volleyball players
Olympic volleyball players of Iran
Volleyball players at the 2020 Summer Olympics
Iranian expatriate sportspeople in Poland
Expatriate volleyball players in Poland
AZS Olsztyn players
Outside hitters